The name Conson has been used to name four tropical cyclones in the northwestern Pacific Ocean. The name was contributed by Vietnam, and comes from the name of Côn Sơn Island in Vietnam.

 Typhoon Conson (2004) (T0404, 07W, Frank), struck Japan
 Typhoon Conson (2010) (T1002, 03W, Basyang), struck the Philippines and Vietnam
 Tropical Storm Conson (2016) (T1606, 08W)
 Tropical Storm Conson (2021) (T2113, 18W, Jolina), rapidly intensified before making landfall in the Philippines and later Vietnam.

Pacific typhoon set index articles